Lissotesta impervia is a species of sea snail, a marine gastropod mollusk, unassigned in the superfamily Seguenzioidea.

Description
The height of the shell attains 2.7 mm.

Distribution
This marine species occurs off Argentina (Santa Cruz) and in the subantarctic waters off South Georgia at depths between 110 m and 252 m.

References

External links
 To World Register of Marine Species

impervia
Gastropods described in 1908